The Joseph H. Rainey House, also known as the Rainey-Camlin House, is a historic house at 909 Prince Street in Georgetown, South Carolina.  Built in the 1760s, it was the home of the first black United States Congressman, Joseph H. Rainey, a former slave.  It was designated a National Historic Landmark in 1984.

Rainey
Rainey, born a slave in 1832 in Georgetown, became a freed black as his parents succeeded in buying their own freedom. His parents were reasonably prosperous with a barbershop business in Charleston, South Carolina which allowed Joseph to gain some private education.

He worked as a steward on a Confederate blockade-runner ship in 1861.  After he was drafted to serve the Confederacy as a laborer in 1862, he was able to escape with his wife to Bermuda, where he also worked as a barber and continued his education.

In 1866, they returned to South Carolina.  In 1868 he was elected to the South Carolina state senate.  In 1870 he assumed the U.S. Congress position denied to B. F. Whittemore on grounds of Whittemore's apparent corruption.  He was reelected, and served four terms, finally losing election in 1878.

He was the longest serving Black congressman until William L. Dawson in the 1950s.

As a Congressman he spoke vigorously in support of enforcement of the Ku Klux Klan Act of 1871.

Rainey returned to his Georgetown home in 1886 and died in 1887.

Home on Prince Street
According to "local tradition", the house was Rainey's birthplace in 1832, and his family lived here until they moved to Charleston in 1846.  More surely known is that "it was from here that he launched his political career in 1867."  While Rainey served in Congress, the house was his district headquarters and he lived here when on recess from Congress.

The home on Prince Street in Georgetown is a single family clapboarded house.  It is 2½ stories tall, with two chimneys and a hipped roof interrupted by hipped dormers. It was restored during 1973–74.  Much of the home is original, including cypress paneling, pine floors, and wainscotting.

The home was listed on the National Register of Historic Places and further was declared a National Historic Landmark in 1984.

See also

List of National Historic Landmarks in South Carolina
National Register of Historic Places listings in Georgetown County, South Carolina

References

External links
Joseph H. Rainey House, Georgetown County (909 Prince St., Georgetown), at South Carolina Department of Archives and History

National Historic Landmarks in South Carolina
National Register of Historic Places in Georgetown County, South Carolina
Houses on the National Register of Historic Places in South Carolina
Houses completed in 1760
Houses in Georgetown County, South Carolina
Buildings and structures in Georgetown, South Carolina
Historic district contributing properties in South Carolina